Minolops pulcherrima is a species of sea snail, a marine gastropod mollusk in the family Solariellidae.

Subspecies
 Minolops pulcherrima emendata (Iredale, 1924) (syn. Minolops emendata)
 Minolops pulcherrima pulcherrima (Angas, 1869)

Description
The height of the shell attains 5 mm, its diameter 8 mm. The rather solid shell has a depressedly conical shape. It is transversely finely ridged, with two or three broader ridges forming keels. The interstices are crossed everywhere with very fine close-set oblique striae. Its color is pinkish or yellowish white stained on the body whorl with bright rose, and spotted on the keels with deep purple lake. The apex is buff. The six whorls are angularly convex. The sutures are broadly and flatly channelled. The body whorl is tricarinate, beneath white and rounded. The wide umbilicus is perspective and crenate within. The aperture is perfectly circular, pearly inside. The peristome is continuous. The thin lips are simple.

Distribution
This marine species is endemic to Australia and occurs off New South Wales.

References

 Angas, G.F. 1869. Descriptions of twelve new species of land and marine shells from Australia and the Solomon Islands. Proceedings of the Zoological Society of London 1869: 45-49
 Gabriel, C.J. 1962. Additions to the marine molluscan fauna of south eastern Australia including descriptions of new genus Pillarginella, six new marine species and two subspecies. Memoirs of the National Museum of Victoria, Melbourne 25: 177–210, 1 pl.
 Iredale, T. & McMichael, D.F. 1962. A reference list of the marine Mollusca of New South Wales. Memoirs of the Australian Museum 11: 1-109
 Wilson, B. 1993. Australian Marine Shells. Prosobranch Gastropods. Kallaroo, Western Australia : Odyssey Publishing Vol. 1 408 pp.

External links
 

Gastropods of Australia
pulcherrima
Gastropods described in 1869